Peter Luder (1415–1472), was a German professor of Latin at the University of Heidelberg from 1456, was the first to introduce humanist ideas in the university.

Notes and references

1415 births
1472 deaths
German Latinists
German Renaissance humanists